Windsor, also known as Annondale, is a historic home located near Port Penn in New Castle County, Delaware, USA. It was built about 1760, and is a two-story, five-bay, gable-roof, brick building with interior brick chimneys at each gable end. It has a center-passage plan with overall dimensions of 45 feet wide by 19 feet deep.  A two-story, wood-frame kitchen wing abuts the rear of the main house. The front facade features a hipped-roof frame porch added in the late-19th century. It is in the Federal style.

It was listed on the National Register of Historic Places in 1992.

References

Houses on the National Register of Historic Places in Delaware
Federal architecture in Delaware
Houses completed in 1760
Houses in New Castle County, Delaware
National Register of Historic Places in New Castle County, Delaware